Saint-Victor-Rouzaud (Languedocien: Sent Victor e Rosaud) is a commune in the Ariège department in southwestern France.

Population
Inhabitants Saint-Victor-Rouzaud are called Saint-Victoriens.

See also
Communes of the Ariège department

References

Communes of Ariège (department)
Ariège communes articles needing translation from French Wikipedia